Acleris clarkei is a species of moth of the family Tortricidae. It is found in North America, where it has been recorded from Michigan, New Brunswick, Manitoba and Washington.

The length of the forewings is 7–8 mm. The forewings are brownish black in the basal two-thirds with two whitish costal patches. The outer-third is brownish grey-white. The hindwings are smoky white. Adults have been recorded on wing in April, May, August and October.

References

Moths described in 1963
clarkei
Moths of North America